Rajčin Sudić (c. 1335 – after 1360) was a Serbian monk-scribe who lived and worked during the time of Lord Vojihna, the father of Jefimija.
 
From the inscription Rajčin Sudić left in the margin of the Chronicles written in the 14th century, we know that he was a prisoner of some feudal ruler of that period. There is some evidence that this ruler was Vojihna because at the time he possessed many fiefs. It is possible that Sudić was a scapegoat of a vehement opponent of "clan government".  That is usurpation of administrative posts by men of two, three and more fiefs, an abuse which threatened to follow the overthrow of Vojihna—he must have been accused by someone that Sudić allegedly conspired to assist Vojihna's enemies and was imprisoned for five months, along with another "accomplice" by the name of Kijevac. While in prison he wrote in "An Inscription":
 

The probable date of the inscription is the year 1360. The manuscript in which that inscription was included was burnt in 1941 when the Serbian National Library in Belgrade, where the manuscript was housed, was hit by bombs from German planes.

See also
Teodosije the Hilandarian (1246–1328), one of the most important Serbian writers in the Middle Ages
Elder Grigorije (fl. 1310–1355), builder of Saint Archangels Monastery
Antonije Bagaš (fl. 1356–1366), bought and restored the Agiou Pavlou monastery
Lazar the Hilandarian (fl. 1404), the first known Serbian and Russian watchmaker
Pachomius the Serb (fl. 1440s–1484), hagiographer of the Russian Church
 Miroslav Gospel
 Gabriel the Hilandarian
 Constantine of Kostenets

References

 Mateja Matejić and Dragan Milivojević, "An Anthology of Medieval Serbian Literature in English", Slavica Publishers, Inc., Columbus, Ohio, 1978, p. 158.

1330s births
14th-century deaths
Year of birth unknown
Year of death unknown
14th-century Serbian writers
Medieval Serbian Orthodox clergy
Medieval European scribes
People of the Serbian Empire